Chiesa di San Giovenale is a church in Orvieto, Umbria, Italy. Initially constructed in 1004, it contains frescos and artefacts from the 12th and 13th centuries. It belongs to the Roman Catholic Diocese of Orvieto-Todi.

History
The church was built in 1004, possibly on the site of an Etruscan temple dedicated to Jupiter. There was an early Christian church on the site, probably from the 6th century, also dedicated to San Giovenale. It stood next to another religious building dedicated to San Savino, the only record of which is contained in a fresco by Ugolino di Prete Ilario in Orvieto Cathedral. The present church was built in 1004 with the support of several rich families in the area and was documented as a parish church in 1028. An inscription on the high altar (GUIDO ABAS MCLXX) indicates that by 1170 it belonged to the order of monks known as Ordine Guglielmino. When the monks left in c. 1248, it again became a parish church. On being reconsecrated by Bishop Giuseppe Marsciano in 1739, it fell under Sant' Agostino until 1810 when it came under the Franciscans. After the Franciscan community was suppressed in 1860, the church was returned to the diocese.

Architecture

The church was initially constructed in the Romanesque style. A tall bell tower stands on the side of the bare facade. The semi-circular apse was removed when, in the 14th century, extensions at the eastern end in the Gothic style terminated in a rectangular apse. There are still traces of the Romanesque porch and the blind arches of the period. An inscription on the lateral door gives its date of construction as 1497. While the lower part of the building is original, the upper part was rebuilt in 1825.

Interior and furnishings
The interior is rich in paintings from the 12th and 13th centuries including votive frescos by the Orvieto school which were recently recovered after being hidden by the Baroque remodelling of the interior in 1632. The most notable work is the 15th-century Maestà known as the Madonna del Soccorso which was donated by the Ghezzi family in the 16th century. It was rediscovered behind a silver screen in the 20th century. In view of the gold ground and the blue mantle, it seems to be late Italo-Byzantine in style. The marble altar, a fine example of Byzantine sculpture, bears the date 1170. It is flanked by late 13th-century marble lecterns bearing symbols of the Evangelists.

In the baptistry, there is a 14th-century fresco of the Ascension of Christ. The entrance is adorned with carved pavement slabs from the 9th century while the font is 15th century.

References

Literature

External links
Illustrated description from Key to Umbria

Roman Catholic churches in Orvieto
Churches completed in 1004
11th-century Roman Catholic church buildings in Italy
Romanesque architecture in Orvieto